Gahuiyeh (also Romanized as Gahū’īyeh; also known as Gahūeeyeh) is a village in Fathabad Rural District, in the Central District of Baft County, Kerman Province, Iran. At the 2006 census, its population was 18, in 5 families.

References 

Populated places in Baft County